Alpha Morgan Capital also known as Alpha Morgan Capital Managers Limited or simply Alpha Morgan is a Nigerian investment banking institution engaged in wealth, portfolio and funds management. The company also serves as an Issuing House, financial advisor and underwriter.

History 
Established in 2012 Alpha Morgan commenced operation as an asset Management Company and an Investment Banking outfit with a shareholders fund of over 300 million Naira and assets under management of over 50 million dollars.

In 2018, the company received a license from the Nigerian Securities and Exchange Commission (SEC) to operate as an Issuing House in Nigeria's capital market. On the same occasion, the company named George Imade as the Managing Director of Alpha Morgan Capital Advisory Partners Limited, one of its arms.

In 2019, Alpha Morgan Capital announced it had entered into a partnership with InfoWARE Limited, a Pan-African financial technology provider to offer its customer more satisfaction through innovative digital technology which it hoped will drive its products.

Also, in 2022, Financial Times ranked the company 4th out of 10 companies in the Financial Service sector across Nigeria, 7th in the General list of all sectors and 22nd in the overall list of 75 Africa’s Fastest-Growing Companies.

Corporate social responsibility 
Alpha Morgan is also known for engaging in some good corporate social responsibilities (CSR) it has delivered across Nigeria. 

In 2020, to ameliorate the impacts of the COVID-19 pandemic from two-minute online video submissions the company randomly selected 10 teachers in Lagos State and gave financial support to them.

Also, in 2021, Alpha Morgan partnered with the IBB International Golf and Country Club, a club of 400 amateur and professional golfers to hold Nigeria’s independence anniversary tournament. Later in the same year, Alpha Morgan Capital partnered with the Lagos State Parks and Gardens Agency to construct medians for two major roads in Lagos.

In 2022, the company partnered with the IBORI Golf and Country Club, to host the 11th IGCC Ladies Open Championship, to support women in sports in Asaba. Later in the same year, the company sponsored the 2022 National University Games Association (NUGA) games competition, which was held in Lagos. They also partnered with Leadway Health Maintenance Organization (Leadway HMO), to provide free medical consultation, counselling, and general body check-up in Lagos. In 2022, as part of its CSR, the company remodelled the Adetokunbo Sofoluwe Park at the University of Lagos (UNILAG), a park named after a former vice-chancellor of the university.

Recognitions and awards

References 

Banks of Nigeria
Standard Bank Group
Banks established in 1989
Companies based in Lagos
Financial services companies established in 1989
Holding companies of Nigeria
Nigerian companies established in 1989
Nigerian subsidiaries of foreign companies
Banking
Nigerian bankers
Stockbrokers
Nigerian stockbrokers
Nigerian investment bankers